Seyi George Olofinjana (born 30 June 1980) is a Nigerian former footballer who played as a midfielder.

Olofinjana began his career with local sides Crown and Kwara United before moving to Europe with Norwegian side SK Brann. After two seasons at Brann he moved to English club Wolverhampton Wanderers. He became a regular at Molineux making 213 appearances for the club over four seasons before joining Premier League club Stoke City in August 2008 for a fee of £3 million. He played only the 2008–09 season with the team before joining another top flight side, Hull City, again for a fee of £3 million.

Career

Early career
Born in Lagos, he has a degree in Chemical Engineering.

He made his debut for the Nigeria national team in June 2000, in a 3–2 win over Malawi.

He moved from Nigeria to play club football in Norway for Brann.

Wolverhampton Wanderers
In July 2004 he moved to England to sign for Wolverhampton Wanderers for a fee of £1.7 million. After having become a regular player for the club, his second season was curtailed by a back injury that also forced him to miss the 2006 African Cup of Nations. In the 2006–07 season, however, finishing as the club's top league goalscorer as they made the play-offs under Mick McCarthy. He netted Wolves' opening goal of the following campaign in a 2–1 defeat to Watford, but could not repeat his goalscoring level of the previous season, scoring only twice more. He missed part of the season as he competed in the 2008 African Cup of Nations where Nigeria lost in the quarter-finals.

Stoke City
In June 2008, following Wolves' failure to win promotion, Olofinjana signed for newly promoted Premier League club Stoke City on a four-year deal for £3 million. He scored his first goal for the club in a home game against Everton in September 2008. After making 21 appearances during the season, Stoke accepted a £2.5 million bid in the close season from French side AS Monaco. Negotiations broke down with Monaco, allowing Hull City to sign Olofinjana for £3 million.

Hull City

Olofinjana joined the Tigers with the club competing in the top division of English football for the only their second-ever season. He scored his first goal for Hull City in a 2–1 win against his former club, Stoke City in November 2009. However, the team was relegated back to the Championship at the end of the campaign. The midfielder was one of a number of departures during the close season as he agreed a season-long loan at fellow Championship team Cardiff City.

At the Welsh club, Olofinjana was reunited with Dave Jones, who had originally brought him into English football when manager of Wolves. The midfielder featured regularly as the team reached the promotion play-offs but lost to Reading. After a total of 42 senior appearances for Cardiff, including their two games in the play-offs, it was announced that he would return to Hull following the loan spell.

Back at Hull, a lengthy knee injury meant that Olofinjana made only five appearances during the 2011–12 season. Although he featured more regularly for the club during the following campaign, he was unable to retain a regular place in their team and was instead loaned out to Sheffield Wednesday in March 2013 until the season's conclusion.

At the conclusion of the 2012–13 season Olofinjana's contract with Hull City expired, leaving him a free agent. He left having made 40 appearances during a four-season stay.

Sheffield Wednesday
Following his release from Hull, Olofinjana joined Sheffield Wednesday on 26 October 2013 and played in a 1–1 draw against Barnsley.

After making four appearances, Olofinjana had his loan spell with Sheffield Wednesday extended for another month. Olofinjana made seven appearances and made his last appearance for the club as an unused substitute on 26 December 2013, in a match against Blackburn Rovers. On the same day, Olofinjana apparently left the club upon the expiry of his contract.

Start
After spending eight months without a club, Olofinjana joined Start in Tippeligaen until the season, where he will be reunited with Mons Ivar Mjelde, who he knew during his time at Brann.

After retirement
In August 2015 Olofinjana started working at Wolverhampton Wanderers's Academy. In February 2019, he was the Loans Pathway Manager at the club.

In April 2021, Olofinjana left Wolves for Swiss side Grasshopper Club Zürich, becoming their new sporting director. He resigned and left on 20 June 2022.

Career statistics

Club
Source:

International
Source:

Honors
Nigeria
Africa Cup of Nations third place:2010

References

External links

1980 births
Living people
Sportspeople from Lagos
Nigerian footballers
Nigeria international footballers
Nigerian expatriate footballers
Nigerian expatriate sportspeople in Norway
Expatriate footballers in Norway
Expatriate footballers in England
Association football midfielders
Kwara United F.C. players
SK Brann players
Yoruba sportspeople
Wolverhampton Wanderers F.C. players
Stoke City F.C. players
Hull City A.F.C. players
Cardiff City F.C. players
Sheffield Wednesday F.C. players
Premier League players
English Football League players
Eliteserien players
2004 African Cup of Nations players
2008 Africa Cup of Nations players
2010 Africa Cup of Nations players
Nigerian expatriate sportspeople in England
Ladoke Akintola University of Technology alumni